Wayanad Heritage Museum, also known as Ambalavayal Heritage Museum is a museum at Ambalavayal, 12 km south of Sulthan Bathery, in Wayanad district, Kerala, India. It is managed by the District Tourism Promotion Council. It has one of Kerala's largest collections of the remnants, dating back to the second century. The museum houses various interesting artifacts revealing the history, culture and heritage of the Wayanad region.

The Museum displays tribal relics and artifacts. Four sectors of the museum—the Veerasmruthi, the Gothrasmruthi, the Devasmruthi, and the Jeevanasmruthi—house different types of items ranging from the Neolithic age to the 17th century, including artifacts from ordinary tribal life, decorated memorial grave stones once used to adorn the graves of heroes, and terracotta figures.

References

External links

Museums in Kerala
Archaeological museums in India
Buildings and structures in Wayanad district
Education in Wayanad district